Dryope flaveola is a fly from the family Dryomyzidae. It has recently been placed in the genus Dryope, having been more widely known as Dryomyza flaveola.

Distribution

This is a western Palearctic fly, found in Austria, Belarus, Belgium, Czech Republic, Denmark, France, Germany, Great Britain, Hungary, Ireland, Italy, Lithuania, Netherlands, Poland, Slovakia, Sweden, Switzerland, European Russia, and Ukraine.

References

Dryomyzidae
Muscomorph flies of Europe
Insects described in 1794
Articles containing video clips